Oscar E. Purner  (December 9, 1872 – December 4, 1915) was a 19th-century Major League Baseball player. He played for the Washington Senators of the National League during the 1895 baseball season. He pitched two innings in one game for the Senators on September 2, 1895, allowing two earned runs.

References

External links
Baseball Reference
Oscar Purner | statmuse

1870s births
1915 deaths
19th-century baseball players
Major League Baseball pitchers
Washington Senators (1891–1899) players
Baseball players from Washington, D.C.